Giorgi Kurdgelashvili (born 7 January 1975) is a Moldovan judoka.

He competed in the Judo at the 2000 Summer Olympics – Men's 60 kg event at the 2000 Summer Olympics, but was eliminated in the quarterfinals by Manolo Poulot and in the repechage by Aidyn Smagulov, both eventual bronze medalists. The same year Kurdgelashvili won one World Cup event, the Dutch Grand Prix.

References
 

1975 births
Living people
Moldovan male judoka
Judoka at the 2000 Summer Olympics
Olympic judoka of Moldova
Naturalised citizens of Moldova
Place of birth missing (living people)